Thế hệ 9X (literally "9X Generation", often referred to simply as 9X) is a Vietnamese term for people born during the 1990s. The usage of 9X was used to refer to both Vietnamese people and people of varying Asian cultures born during the 1990s. The 9X generation of Vietnam refers to those that grew up during the development of Vietnam's economy, information technology, and other influential events that opened Vietnam to the world.

They are described as being a progressive and rebellious generation. They are often described as being more confident than members of older generations, they dare to freely pursue personal interests, and are more proficient in foreign languages. Technology, specifically the internet, is an important part of their lives. They are also willing to reject established traditions, ignore elder class values, listen to classical music, and follow foreign fashion trends and life styles.

See also 

 Buddha-like mindset
 Demographics of Vietnam
 Generation Y
 Generation Z
 N-po generation, Korean concept
 Post-90s, Chinese equivalent
 Satori generation, Japanese concept
 Sampo generation, Korean equivalent
 Strawberry Generation, Taiwanese counterpart
 Tang ping, Chinese term

Notes

Cultural generations
Demographics of Vietnam
1990s in Vietnam